The Hauptstadion is a stadium located in Sport Park Soers in Aachen, Germany. It is used for equestrian and show jumping. It was renovated in 2005 and has a capacity of 40,000 spectators.  It hosted the 2006 FEI World Equestrian Games.

In July 1970, it was the location of the Aachen Open Air Pop Festival.

External links 
Venue information
CHIO Aachen

Horse racing venues in Germany
Show jumping venues
Buildings and structures in Aachen
Sport in Aachen
Sports venues in North Rhine-Westphalia